Events from the year 1953 in literature .

Events
Beckett's novel The Unnamable is also published in French this year.
January 22 – The Crucible, a historical drama by Arthur Miller written as an allegory of McCarthyism, opens on Broadway at the Martin Beck Theatre.
February 19 – The State of Georgia approves the first literature censorship board in the United States.
April 13 – The face of popular literature changes with the publication of Ian Fleming's novel Casino Royale, introducing the British spy character James Bond.
May – The semi-autobiographical Go Tell It on the Mountain by James Baldwin is published. In 2001, it will be named as one of the 100 best English-language novels of the 20th century by the editors of the American Modern Library.
June 17 – Bertolt Brecht continues uninterrupted with rehearsals for the first production of Erwin Strittmatter's Katzgraben: Szenen aus dem Bauernleben, with the Berliner Ensemble during the Uprising of 1953 in East Germany. The incident inspires Günter Grass's Die Plebejer proben den Aufstand ("The Plebeians Rehearse the Uprising", 1966).
July 13 – The first Stratford Shakespearean Festival of Canada opens in Stratford, Ontario.
September – French journalist Jean Borel's article "Zola a-t-il été assassiné?" in the September–October edition of Libération suggests that Émile Zola's death in 1902 was not accidental.
September 9 – The Supreme Court decision in Rumely v. United States affirms that indirect lobbying in the United States by distribution of books intended to influence opinion is a public good and not subject to regulation by Congress.
October – The literary magazine Encounter begins publication in London under the editorship of the American political journalist Irving Kristol and the English poet Stephen Spender, with covert sponsorship by the Central Intelligence Agency.
October 21 – Shortly after being knighted, the English actor Sir John Gielgud is convicted of "persistently importuning male persons for an immoral purpose" (cottaging) in Chelsea, London.
November 5 – Dylan Thomas, on a poetry reading tour of the United States, is admitted to St. Vincent's Hospital, Manhattan in a coma, which continues until his death on November 9. Early versions of his play for voices Under Milk Wood have been given in the United States this year, but it is not broadcast in its final form until 1954.
December – The American novelist Howard Fast is awarded the Stalin Peace Prize.
unknown dates
Ronald Harwood joins Sir Donald Wolfit's theatre company, and becomes his dresser.
John Dickson Carr's final Sir Henry Merrivale mystery novel, writing as Carter Dickson, is published.
After five years as an English teacher, Frederick Buechner moves to New York City to become a full-time writer.
Federico García Lorca's Obras Completas (Complete Works) are published in Spain as a prohibition on his work is lifted there.
Brian O'Nolan is obliged to retire from a senior post in the Civil Service of the Republic of Ireland on grounds of alcoholism and impoliteness to senior politicians.
City Lights Bookstore is established in San Francisco by Lawrence Ferlinghetti and Peter D. Martin.

New books

Fiction
Ilse Aichinger – Der Gefesselte (The Bound Man, short stories)
Sholom Aleichem – Adventures of Mottel the Cantor's Son (translation)
Phyllis Shand Allfrey – The Orchid House
Eric Ambler – The Schirmer Inheritance
Mulk Raj Anand – The Private Life of an Indian Prince
Isaac Asimov – Second Foundation
Nigel Balchin 
 Private Interests
 Sundry Creditors
James Baldwin – Go Tell It on the Mountain
Saul Bellow – The Adventures of Augie March (published in September)
 Nicolas Bentley – Third Party Risk
Alfred Bester – The Demolished Man
John Bingham – Five Roundabouts to Heaven
Zealia Bishop – The Curse of Yig
Heinrich Böll – And Never Said a Word (Und sagte kein einziges Wort)
Ray Bradbury
Fahrenheit 451 (published in October)
The Golden Apples of the Sun
Gwendolyn Brooks – Maud Martha
William S. Burroughs (as William Lee) – Junkie
John Dickson Carr (as Carter Dickson) – The Cavalier's Cup
 Max Catto – A Prize of Gold
 Henry Cecil – Natural Causes
Raymond Chandler – The Long Goodbye
James Hadley Chase – I'll Bury My Dead
Agatha Christie
After the Funeral
A Pocket Full of Rye
Arthur C. Clarke
Against the Fall of Night
Childhood's End
Beverly Cleary – Otis Spofford
Ivy Compton-Burnett – The Present and the Past
 Edmund Crispin – Beware of the Trains
A. J. Cronin – Beyond This Place
Roald Dahl – Someone Like You (short stories, including "Nunc Dimittis")
Cecil Day-Lewis – The Dreadful Hollow
L. Sprague de Camp
The Continent Makers and Other Tales of the Viagens
Sprague de Camp's New Anthology of Science Fiction
The Tritonian Ring and Other Pusadian Tales
L. Sprague de Camp and Fletcher Pratt – Tales from Gavagan's Bar
Lloyd C. Douglas – The Robe (originally published in 1942)
Islwyn Ffowc Elis – Cysgod y Cryman (Shadow of the Sickle)
Ian Fleming – Casino Royale
C. S. Forester – Hornblower and the Atropos
Ernest K. Gann – The High and the Mighty
 Anthony Gilbert – Footsteps Behind Me
 Rumer Godden – Kingfishers Catch Fire
Richard Gordon – Doctor at Sea
Davis Grubb – The Night of the Hunter
Mark Harris – The Southpaw
L. P. Hartley – The Go-Between
James Hilton – Time and Time Again
Shirley Jackson – Life Among the Savages
David Karp – One
 Margaret Kennedy – Troy Chimneys
Wolfgang Koeppen – Das Treibhaus (The Hothouse)
Camara Laye – L'Enfant noir
Ira Levin – A Kiss Before Dying
Audrey Erskine Lindop – The Singer Not the Song
Eric Linklater – The House of Gair
 E. C. R. Lorac 
 Crook O'Lune
 Murder as a Fine Art
Virgilio Rodríguez Macal – Carazamba
Angus MacVicar – The Lost Planet
Wolf Mankowitz – A Kid for Two Farthings
Ngaio Marsh – Spinsters in Jeopardy
James A. Michener – The Bridges at Toko-ri
Gladys Mitchell – Merlin's Furlong
Roger Nimier – Nothing to Make a Fuss About
Flannery O'Connor – "A Good Man Is Hard to Find" (short story)
Zoe B. Oldenbourg – The Cornerstone
Alan Paton – Too Late the Phalarope
Mervyn Peake – Mr Pye
Barbara Pym – Jane and Prudence
Ellery Queen – The Scarlet Letters
Marjorie Kinnan Rawlings – The Sojourner
Mary Renault – The Charioteer
Karl Ristikivi – Hingede öö (The Night of Souls)
Alain Robbe-Grillet – Les Gommes (The Erasers)
Juan Rulfo – El Llano en llamas (The Burning Plain, short stories)
J. D. Salinger – Nine Stories
Samuel Shellabarger – Lord Vanity
Wilmar H. Shiras – Children of the Atom
Howard Spring – A Sunset Touch
Rex Stout – The Golden Spiders
Theodore Sturgeon – More Than Human
Julian Symons – The Broken Penny
Jim Thompson – Savage Night
Leon Uris – Battle Cry
Boris Vian – Heartsnatcher
A. E. van Vogt – The Universe Maker
Henry Wade – Too Soon to Die
John Wain – Hurry on Down
Evelyn Waugh – Love Among the Ruins
Dennis Wheatley – Curtain of Fear
Dorothy Whipple – Someone at a Distance
Ben Ames Williams – The Unconquered
John Wyndham – The Kraken Wakes
 Frank Yerby – The Devil's Laughter

Children and young people
Rev. W. Awdry – Gordon the Big Engine (eighth in The Railway Series of 42 books by him and his son Christopher Awdry)
Viola Bayley – White Holiday
Bruce Carter – Speed Six!
Roger Lancelyn Green – King Arthur and His Knights of the Round Table
C. S. Lewis – The Silver Chair (fourth in The Chronicles of Narnia series of seven books)
Elinor Lyon – Run Away Home
Joan Phipson – Good Luck to the Rider
Joan G. Robinson – Teddy Robinson
Miriam Schlein – When Will the World Be Mine? (non-fiction)
Geoffrey Willans (illustrated by Ronald Searle) – Down with Skool! A Guide to School Life for Tiny Pupils and their Parents (first in the Nigel Molesworth series of four books)

Drama
Arthur Adamov – Professor Taranne (Le Professeur Taranne)
Robert Anderson – Tea and Sympathy
Alex Atkinson – Four Winds
Samuel Beckett – Waiting for Godot (En attendant Godot)
 Mary Hayley Bell – The Uninvited Guest
Ugo Betti – The Fugitive (La Fuggitiva, premiered posthumously)
 Peter Blackmore – Down Came a Blackbird
Wynyard Browne –  A Question of Fact
Agatha Christie – Witness for the Prosecution
Campbell Christie and Dorothy Christie – Carrington V.C.
R. F. Delderfield – The Orchard Walls
Max Frisch – The Fire Raisers (Biedermann und die Brandstifter, originally for radio)
Witold Gombrowicz – The Marriage (Ślub, Polish version published)
Kenneth Horne –  Trial and Error
N. C. Hunter – A Day by the Sea
William Inge - Picnic
Arthur Miller – The Crucible
Erwin Strittmatter – Katzgraben
Vernon Sylvaine – As Long as They're Happy
Emlyn Williams – Someone Waiting

Poetry
The Faber Book of Twentieth Century Verse edited by John Heath-Stubbs and David Wright

Non-fiction
George Dangerfield – The Era of Good Feelings (Bancroft Prize)
L. Sprague de Camp – Science-Fiction Handbook
M. Dena Gardiner – The Principles of Exercise Therapy
Gerald Durrell – The Overloaded Ark
Lawrence Durrell – Reflections on a Marine Venus
Geoffrey Elton – The Tudor Revolution in Government
Heinrich Harrer – Seven Years in Tibet
Clarence C. Hulley – Alaska 1741–1953
Czesław Miłosz – The Captive Mind
Nancy Mitford – Madame de Pompadour
Roger Peyrefitte – Les Clés de saint Pierre (The Keys of St Peter)
K. M. Panikkar – Asia and Western Dominance
Sebastian Snow – My Amazon Adventure
R. W. Southern – The Making of the Middle Ages
John Summerson – Architecture in Britain: 1530–1830
Ludwig Wittgenstein – Philosophical Investigations

Births
January 7 – Dionne Brand, Canadian poet
February 5 – Giannina Braschi, Puerto Rican-born poet and novelist
February 6 – Kaoru Takamura, Japanese novelist
February 10 – John Shirley, American science fiction and horror writer
February 18 – Peter Robinson, English poet
March 12 – Carl Hiaasen, American journalist and novelist
March 25 – John Tierney, American journalist
March 26 – George Dyson, American science historian
April 3
Pieter Aspe (Pierre Aspelag), Belgian crime writer
Sandra Boynton, American humorist and children's writer
April 20 – Sebastian Faulks, English novelist
April 23 – Roberto Bolaño, Chilean-born fiction writer (died 2003)
May 10 – Christopher Paul Curtis, American children's writer
May 12 – Neil Astley, English author, poet and academic
May 19 – Victoria Wood, English comedian and writer (died 2016)
July 9 – Thomas Ligotti, American horror writer
July 29 – Frank McGuinness, Irish dramatist, poet and novelist
August 1 – Howard Kurtz, American journalist and author
August 10 – Mark Doty, American poet and memoirist
August 17 – Korrie Layun Rampan, Indonesian writer (died 2015)
September 5 – Herman Koch, Dutch fiction writer and actor
September 10 – Pat Cadigan, American science fiction author
September 23 – Nicholas Witchell, English television journalist
November 5 – Joyce Maynard, American memoirist and fiction writer
November 18 – Alan Moore, English comic-book and graphic-novel scriptwriter
November 29 - Janet McNaughton, Canadian young-adult fiction writer
December 15 – Doug Lucie, English dramatist
unknown date – Gary Taylor, American Shakespearean scholar

Deaths
April 4 – Rachilde (Marguerite Vallette-Eymery), French author (born 1860)
April 6 – Idris Davies, Welsh poet in Welsh and English (abdominal cancer, born 1905)
April 9 – C. E. M. Joad, English philosopher and broadcaster (born 1891)
April 10 – Gordon Hall Gerould, American philologist (born 1877)
April 13 – Alice Milligan, Irish poet (born 1865)
April 24 – Alfred Vierkandt, German sociologist (born 1867)
June 5 – Moelona, Welsh-language novelist and translator (born 1877)
June 25 – Richard Jebb, English journalist (born 1874)
June 30 – Elsa Beskow, Swedish children's author and illustrator (born 1874)
July 6 – Julia de Burgos, Puerto Rican poet in Spanish (pneumonia, born 1914)
July 16 – Hilaire Belloc, English humorous poet, essayist and travel writer (born 1870)
August 12 – J. H. M. Abbott, Australian novelist and poet (born 1874)
August 30 – Maurice Nicoll, English psychiatrist and writer on psychology (born 1884)
September 19 – Eirik Vandvik, Norwegian classicist and translator (born 1904)
November 8
Ivan Bunin, Russian-born writer and Nobel laureate (born 1870)
John van Melle, South African author (born 1887)
November 9 – Dylan Thomas, Welsh poet and author (pneumonia, born 1914)
November 27
Eugene O'Neill, American playwright (born 1888)
T. F. Powys, English novelist (born 1875)
November 30 – Francis Picabia, French poet and painter 1879)
December 8 – Claude Scudamore Jarvis, English colonial governor, writer, Arabist and naturalist (born 1879)
December 26 – Lulah Ragsdale, American poet, novelist, and actor  (born 1861)
probable – Tan Khoen Swie, Indonesian publisher

Awards
Carnegie Medal for children's literature: Edward Osmond, A Valley Grows Up
Christopher Award: Marie Killilea, Karen
Governor General's Award for Poetry or Drama: Douglas LePan, The Net and the Sword 
James Tait Black Memorial Prize for fiction: Margaret Kennedy, Troy Chimneys
James Tait Black Memorial Prize for biography: Carola Oman, Sir John Moore
National Book Award for Fiction: Ralph Ellison, Invisible Man
Newbery Medal for children's literature: Ann Nolan Clark, Secret of the Andes
Nobel Prize for Literature: Sir Winston Leonard Spencer Churchill
Premio Nadal: Luisa Forrellad, Siempre en capilla
Pulitzer Prize for Drama: William Inge, Picnic
Pulitzer Prize for Fiction: Ernest Hemingway, The Old Man and the Sea
Pulitzer Prize for Poetry: Archibald MacLeish, Collected Poems 1917-1952
Queen's Gold Medal for Poetry: Arthur Waley

References

 
Years of the 20th century in literature